Luc Thévenaz (born 1958 in Geneva) is a Swiss physicist who specializes in fibre optics. He is a professor of physics at EPFL (École Polytechnique Fédérale de Lausanne) and the head of the Group for Fibre Optics School of Engineering.

Career 

Thévenaz studied a Master's degree in physics at University of Geneva and in 1982 wrote his thesis in astrophysics at the Geneva Observatory under the supervision of André Maeder, in which he developed a model to predict the effect of stellar wind on the apparent radius and temperature of stars. He then joined Jean-Paul Pellaux at University of Geneva as PhD student, and graduated in 1988 with a thesis on measurement of chromatic dispersion in optical fibres. During this time, he designed a technique to make accurate time delay measurements with picosecond resolution using a halogen lamp light source. As a postdoctoral researcher he joined Philippe Robert at EPFL's Institute of Electrical Engineering in 1988, to conduct research on polarization mode dispersion and brfringence measurements in optical fibres. In 1991, he visited visiting postdoctoral researcher both PUC University in Rio de Janeiro to develop fast pulse detector using semiconductor laser dynamics, and the Ginzton Lab in the group of Herbert John Shaw at Stanford University to do research on optical gyroscopes using stimulated Brillouin scattering lasers in optical fibres.

In 1992, he became a research associate EPFL's Institute of Electrical Engineering, and continued his research on stimulated Brillouin scattering in optical fibres and applied it to distributed fibre sensors. As visiting scientist he joined in 1998 KAIST (Korean Advanced Institute of Science and Technology) to work on Brillouin fibre lasers. In 1998, he was made senior lecturer at EPFL, and started working on advanced measurement techniques and signal processing in optical fibres, and on gas traces detection using laser spectroscopy and photo-acoustic detection. By using stimulated Brillouin scattering, he was able to demonstrate the generation of slow and fast light in optical fibres.

Since 2007 he has been visiting professor at Shanghai Jiao Tong University, Tel Aviv University, University of Sydney, and the Technical University of Valencia.

Since 2008 Thévenaz has been adjunct professor at EPFL's Institute of Electrical Engineering and head of the Group of Fibre Optics.

Research 
Thévenaz's research is focused on distributed fibre sensing and on slow & fast light.

Among his key findings figure novel techniques to achieve centimetric spatial resolutions and increase the number of resolved points up to 1 million in distributed fibre sensing; the development on coding techniques and contributions to the determination of fundamental limits; the application of spider silk optical fibre in chemical sensing; and the achievement of massive optical amplification in hollow core fibres using stimulated Brillouin scattering in gases.

Thévenaz's research was featured in several news outlet such as: Optics, ScienceDaily, Le Nouvelliste, 24 heures, and RTS.

Distinctions 
Among others Thévenaz is a fellow of the Optical Society of America (since 2010), and the IEEE (since 2017). He has been a co-executive editor-in-chief of the journal Nature Light (since 2018) and an editorial advisory board member of the Journal APL Photonics.

He was a coordinator of the Marie-Curie Innovative Training Network “FINESSE - Fibre Nervous Sensing Systems” (2016-2020).

He is a member of the SwissPhotonics (since 2013), and the SPIE (since 2015).

He is the co-founder of the spin-off company Omnisens producing long-distance distributed fibre sensing systems. Their technology enable asset integrity monitoring solutions for critical oil and gas, power and civil engineering infrastructures.

Selected works

References

External links 
 
 Website of the Group for Fibre Optics

University of Geneva alumni
1958 births
Living people
Academic staff of the École Polytechnique Fédérale de Lausanne
Optical physicists
People from Geneva
20th-century Swiss physicists
21st-century Swiss physicists

fr:André Maeder